The Nannen Arboretum is an  arboretum and botanical garden located at 28 Parkside Drive, Ellicottville, New York. It is nonprofit and open to the public.

The arboretum was organized in 1976 and contains over 250 species of trees, shrubs, flowers, and herbs.  It includes several Japanese gardens, a pond with fish, a large herb garden, and nature walks. The Nannen Arboretum was affiliated with the Cornell Cooperative Extension prior to 2013, at which time the arboretum was transferred to the Town of Ellicottville.

See also 
 List of botanical gardens in the United States

References

External links 
 Nannen Arboretum

Arboreta in New York (state)
Protected areas of Cattaraugus County, New York